Myntdu River is one of the major water bodies in Jaintia Hills District, Meghalaya, locally known as 'ka Tawiar ka Takan' (Our Guardian Angel) in the Pnar dialect. It is a blessing to the residents of the town of Jowai and adjacent places. Its abundant water is used to irrigate the Myntdu Valley, located on the outskirts of Jowai town.

Sources
The river originates at a place called Mihmyntdu, adjacent to Jowai town. This river encircles Jowai on three sides excluding the northern part of town.

Course
The river flows across Jowai, and then through Leshka (where a Hydro Project Dam is being constructed) to reach a village Borghat, within Jaintia Hills, before finally entering Bangladesh, where it is locally called 'Shari'.

Projects
The Myntdu-Leshka Hydro Project Dam (3X42 MW) built across the river, undertaken by MeECL, scheduled in three phases, is located at
Leshka, West Jaintia Hills district, Meghalaya near Amlarem, the sub-division headquarters. The project cost is estimated to be around INR 360 crores.

See also
 Jowai

References

Rivers of Meghalaya
Rivers of India